Carlos Schvartzman (November 4, 1947) is a Paraguayan pianist, guitarist, composer, arranger and orchestrator of jazz and contemporary music. He was born and raised in Asunción, the capital of Paraguay. He has also been involved in pop music, writing orchestral arrangements for soloists, vocal groups, music for TV, advertising jingles, and occasionally a classic style music with modern harmony of the 20th century. He participated as a conductor, arranger and composer for international song festivals (such as Viña del Mar, during the 70s). He is regarded as one of the most notable musicians in the country.

Schvartzman was born in Asunción, into a family of Ukrainian-Jewish background.

References 

1947 births
Living people
Jazz guitarists
Jewish musicians
Paraguayan Jews
Paraguayan composers
Male composers
Paraguayan musicians
Paraguayan pianists
Paraguayan guitarists
Paraguayan people of Ukrainian-Jewish descent
People from Asunción
Male pianists
21st-century pianists
21st-century male musicians
Male jazz musicians